Sonneratia ovata is a mangrove tree in the family Lythraceae. The specific epithet  is from the Latin meaning "oval", referring to the shape of the leaf.

Description
The grey bark is smooth to fissured bark. The calyx is cup-shaped with its inner surface reddish at the base.

Distribution and habitat
Sonneratia ovata grows naturally from southern China (Hainan) to Indochina, Malesia, Palau, New Guinea and Australia. Its habitat is on tidal river banks and on muddy soils subject to spring tides.

Uses
The mature fruit is eaten in Sarawak.

References

ovata
Trees of China
Flora of Hainan
Trees of Indo-China
Trees of Malesia
Flora of Palau
Trees of Australia
Plants described in 1920
Central Indo-Pacific flora